The pope's hat may refer to:

 Papal tiara, a jewelled three-tiered crown used at papal coronations from 1305 through 1963
 Mitre, a high liturgical headdress made of plain white silk (Mitre Simplex) or highly decorated (Mitre Pretiosa)
 Zucchetto, a small skullcap worn by clerics
 Camauro, a winter cap worn in place of the zucchetto from the 12th century through to 2005
 Cappello romano, a broad-brimmed hat previously worn by popes, cardinals, bishops and priests

See also
 Papal regalia and insignia
 Popehat, a legal blog